The men's 100 metres competition at the 2012 Summer Olympics in London, United Kingdom was held at the Olympic Stadium on 4–5 August 2012. Seventy-four athletes from 61 nations competed. Each nation was limited to 3 athletes per rules in force since the 1930 Olympic Congress. The competition comprised four rounds: a preliminary round for entrants without the minimum qualifying standard, a heats round, followed by three semi-finals of eight athletes each, which then reduced to eight athletes for the final. 

Just before the start of the final, a spectator threw a plastic bottle into Tyson Gay's lane, intended to hit Usain Bolt who was three lanes outside in Lane 7. The race was unaffected, and Bolt became the second man in history to defend a 100m Olympic title. The spectator, later identified as Ashley Gill-Webb, was soon arrested after he was struck on the head by Dutch judoka and bronze medalist Edith Bosch, whom he happened to be sitting next to. LOCOG Chairman Sebastian Coe later stated: "I'm not suggesting vigilantism but it was actually poetic justice that they happened to be sitting next to a judo player". Gill-Webb later pleaded not guilty to a charge of using threatening words or behaviour with intent to cause harassment, alarm or distress at Stratford Magistrates' Court. He was later found guilty.

Summary

Leading up to this Olympics, defending champion Usain Bolt was the star of the sport having set world records in winning the 100 metres and 200 metres in the previous Olympics, and 2 more world records in winning the 100m and 200m at the 2009 world championships. In the 2011 world championships, the 100 metres was won by Yohan Blake after a false start by Bolt. Later in the season, Blake ran a new 200 metres personal best only .07 behind Bolt's world record. At the 2012 Jamaican Olympic Trials, Blake beat Bolt in both events.

The seven round one heats were won by three Jamaican and three American favorites and Dwain Chambers of Britain. Ryan Bailey was the fastest qualifier with a personal best 9.88.

In the first semi-final, Justin Gatlin ran the fastest semi-final in history 9.82, ahead of Churandy Martina 9.91and former world record holder Asafa Powell in 9.94. Suwaibou Sanneh improved his national record for Gambia at 10.18, set the day before. In the second semi-final, defending champion  Usain Bolt ran a relaxed race, finishing in 9.87.  Ryan Bailey was second in 9.96. In the third semi-final, Yohan Blake ran 9.85, with Tyson Gay in second at 9.90. The final qualifier was defending silver medalist Richard Thompson with 10.02.

In the final, Bolt, started slow out of the blocks and was behind Blake and Gatlin, but accelerated with 50 meters to go, to win the gold medal and was around five feet (1.5 meters) ahead of the competition at the finish line. Bolt set a new Olympic record (beating his own record set at the 2008 Olympic Games) of 9.64 seconds, later rounded down to 9.63 seconds. Blake edged past Gatlin, who in turn held off a closing Gay at the finish line.

Usain Bolt was the second athlete after Carl Lewis (1984, 1988) to retain the men's 100m championship. His winning time was the second fastest time ever behind his own world record. Yohan Blake finished second in 9.75 seconds. Blake's time was the fastest ever not to win a gold medal. 2004 Olympic champion Justin Gatlin won the bronze medal in 9.79 seconds. The race set a number of records, including: the first time that the top 3 finished under 9.80 seconds; the first time that the top 5 finished in under 9.90 seconds; the first time that the five fastest men in 100m history (Bolt, Gay, Blake, Powell and Gatlin) all competed; and 7 of the 8 men ran in under 10 seconds, with only Asafa Powell finished in (11.99) after an injury 60 meters into the race. Apart from Powell, each runner's time was the fastest-ever for his respective placing. Blake, Gatlin, Gay, and Bailey all ran times that would have won at least silver in any previous Olympic final. It is considered one of the most outstanding finishes of the men's 100 metres in Olympic history.

Background

This was the twenty-seventh time the event was held, having appeared at every Olympics since the first in 1896. The field was star-studded: 2008 finalists returning were defending gold medalist Usain Bolt of Jamaica, silver medalist Richard Thompson of Trinidad and Tobago, fourth-place finisher Churandy Martina of the Netherlands (Netherlands Antilles in 2008), and fifth-place finisher Asafa Powell of Jamaica (who had now finished fifth twice in a row). The 2004 gold medalist, Justin Gatlin of the United States, returned, along with Tyson Gay and Ryan Bailey. Yohan Blake, the reigning world champion who had beat Bolt at the Jamaican Olympic trials, joined Bolt and Powell for Jamaica.

For the first time ever, no nation made its debut in the event. Lithuania returned for the first time since 1928. The United States made its 26th appearance in the event, most of any country, having missed only the boycotted 1980 Games.

Qualification

A National Olympic Committee (NOC) could enter up to 3 qualified athletes in the men's 100 metres event if all athletes met the A standard, or 1 athlete if they met the B standard. The qualifying time standards could be obtained in various meets during the qualifying period that had the approval of the IAAF. For the sprints and short hurdles, including the 100 metres, only outdoor meets were eligible. The A standard for the 2012 men's 100 metres was 10.18 seconds; the B standard was 10.24 seconds. The qualifying period for was from 1 May 2011 to 8 July 2012. NOCs could also have an athlete enter the 100 metres through a universality place. NOCs could enter one male athlete in an athletics event, regardless of time, if they had no male athletes meeting the qualifying A or B standards in any men's athletic event.

Competition format

The event saw its first significant format change since the introduction of the "fastest loser" system in 1968: the basic four round format introduced in 1920 was changed to a three-round format with preliminaries. The fastest entrants would now have to run only three times, not four. The preliminaries were reserved for the entrants using universality places (that is, not meeting the qualification standards). The changes also expanded the number of semifinals from 2 to 3 (and thus the number of semifinalists from 16 to 24), including using the "fastest loser" system in the semifinals for the first time.

The preliminary round consisted of 4 heats, each with 7 or 8 athletes. The top two runners in each heat advanced, along with the next two fastest runners overall. They joined the faster entrants in the first round of heats, which consisted of 7 heats of 8 athletes each. The top three runners in each heat, along with the next three fastest runners overall, moved on to the semifinals. The 24 semifinalists competed in three heats of 8, with the top two in each semifinal and the next two overall advancing to the eight-man final.

Records
, the existing World and Olympic records were as follows.

The following new Olympic record was set during this competition:

The following new National records were set during this competition

Schedule
All times are British Summer Time (UTC+1).

Results

Preliminaries

Qualification rule: The first two finishers in each heat (Q) plus the two fastest times of those who finished third or lower in their heat (q) qualified.

Preliminary heat 1

Preliminary heat 2

Preliminary heat 3

Preliminary heat 4

Round 1

Qualification rule: The first three finishers in each heat (Q) plus the three fastest times of those who finished fourth or lower in their heat (q) qualified.

Heat 1

Heat 2

Heat 3

Heat 4

Heat 5

Heat 6

Heat 7

Semifinals

Qualification rule: The first two finishers in each heat (Q) plus the two fastest times of those who finished third or lower in their heat (q) qualified.

Semifinal 1

Semifinal 2

Semifinal 3

Final

Incident
Just before the start of the final, a spectator threw a plastic beer bottle at the competitors in the starting blocks. Though the race was unaffected, he was arrested. The man, later identified as Ashley Gill-Webb, happened to be sitting next to Dutch judoka and bronze medalist Edith Bosch, who promptly struck him with her hand on the back of his head after the toss. LOCOG Chairman Sebastian Coe later stated: "I'm not suggesting vigilantism but it was actually poetic justice that they happened to be sitting next to a judo player". Gill-Webb later pleaded not guilty to a charge of using threatening words or behaviour with intent to cause harassment, alarm or distress at Stratford Magistrates' Court. He was later found guilty.

References

100 Metres Men
2012
Men's events at the 2012 Summer Olympics